Peralta Canyon is a canyon on the backside of Superstition Mountain within the Superstition Mountains. The canyon is a popular hiking destination within the Tonto National Forest and contains a single trail up the canyon to Fremont Saddle at the top of the canyon.

Superstition Mountains
Canyons and gorges of Arizona
Landforms of Pinal County, Arizona
Tonto National Forest